A navigation authority is a company or statutory body which is concerned with the management of a navigable canal or river.

Rights of a navigation authority
Whilst the rights of individual authorities vary, a navigation authority will typically have a right to:
Implement a registration or licensing scheme for boats on waterways under their control
Levy a licence fee, tolls or both on vessels using the waterway
Lay down rules regarding the manner in which vessels shall be navigated.

Responsibilities of a navigation authority
Again, responsibilities vary, but will usually include:
Maintaining locks and other structures
Dredging the channel
Flood control

Ownership of the waterway
Whilst a navigation authority may own the land over which the waterway runs, and usually does in the case of artificial waterways, this is not invariably the case, and particularly in the case of river navigations, the land beneath the river may belong to riparian landowners.

List of navigation authorities

United Kingdom

Major authorities
Canal & River Trust - most canals and approximately half of all rivers
Environment Agency
Fens and Anglian system: Ancholme, Glen, Great Ouse, Nene, Stour, Welland
Medway
Wye and Lugg
Non-tidal Thames
Royal Military Canal

Minor authorities
Basingstoke Canal Authority (Basingstoke Canal)
Broads Authority
Conservators of the River Cam
Manchester Ship Canal Company
Port of Tyne
Middle Level Commissioners (Middle Level Navigations)
National Trust (River Wey and Godalming Navigations)
Port of London Authority (Tidal River Thames)

Other bodies

Association of Inland Navigation Authorities

France
Voies navigables de France

The Netherlands
Rijkswaterstaat

United States
List of navigation authorities in the United States

See also

Canals of the United Kingdom
History of the British canal system

References

Water transport in the United Kingdom